Jeevan Sudha (also known as Jeevan Deep) is a high-rise located in Kolkata, India. It is located on Chowringhee Road beside Tata Centre.

Details
Jeevan Sudha is one of the landmarks in Chowringhee, the central business district of the city. It is a commercial building and was built in 1986 by Life Insurance Corporation of India. It has many offices of LIC, banks like the State Bank of India NRI Branch and other financial organisations.

See also
 List of tallest buildings in Kolkata

References

Office buildings in Kolkata
Skyscraper office buildings in India